Mohamad Reza Khanjani (born 8 February 1992) is an Iranian badminton player. In 2014, he won the men's doubles title at the South Africa International tournament, and in 2015, he was the runner-up at the Turkey International.

Achievements

BWF International Challenge/Series
Men's Doubles

 BWF International Challenge tournament
 BWF International Series tournament
 BWF Future Series tournament

References

External links 
 

1992 births
Living people
Iranian male badminton players